Kate Elliott is the pen name of American fantasy and science fiction writer Alis A. Rasmussen (born 1958).

Writing 
Although Rasmussen's first novels The Labyrinth Gate (1988) and The Highroad (1990) (a science fiction trilogy) failed to become bestsellers, additional publishers liked her manuscripts. However, they wanted a fresh name unconnected with the sales figures of the previous books. Starting in 1992 under the new name of Kate Elliott, her sales have flourished. The Crown of Stars series has been featured in the Science Fiction Book Club.

Elliott published the first of her Jaran series in 1992, although she began the first draft in 1980. Heather Massey's review of Jaran describes it as "a science fiction romance classic", while Todd Richmond in an SF Site review calls the series "an epic masterpiece". The Highroad (as Alis Rasmussen) trilogy is set in the same universe as Jaran as a prequel.

The 1996 collaboration between Elliott, Melanie Rawn, and Jennifer Roberson on The Golden Key was coordinated primarily via fax machine.

In 2020, Elliott published Unconquerable Sun, the first novel in a gender-bending space opera trilogy based on Alexander the Great.

Personal life
A native of Junction City, Oregon, Rasmussen moved to Oakland, California to attend Mills College.  There she became active in the Society for Creative Anachronism where she pursued medieval sword fighting.

Rasmussen, her archaeologist husband Jay Silverstein, and their three children live in Hawaii.

Bibliography

As Alis A. Rasmussen

The Labyrinth Gate (1988) fantasy, 
The Highroad Trilogy science fiction
A Passage of Stars, Open Road Media Sci-Fi & Fantasy (1990), 
Revolution's Shore (1990), 
The Price of Ransom (1990),

As Kate Elliott

The Spiritwalker Trilogy fantasy series
Cold Magic, Orbit,  (2010)
Cold Fire, Orbit,  (September, 2011)
Cold Steel, Orbit,  (July 2, 2013)
The Beatriceid (novelette, 2015)
Crossroads fantasy series
Spirit Gate, Tor Books,  (2007)
Shadow Gate, Tor Books,  (2008)
Traitors' Gate, Tor Books,  (2009)
Crown of Stars fantasy series
King's Dragon, DAW, (1997), finalist for 1997 Nebula Award for Best Novel
Prince of Dogs, DAW,  (1998)
The Burning Stone (1999)
Child of Flame (2000)
The Gathering Storm (2003)
In the Ruins (Aug 2005)
The Crown of Stars, DAW,  (Feb 2006)
The Golden Key (1996), a collaboration with Melanie Rawn and Jennifer Roberson; World Fantasy Award finalist for Best Novel of 1996
The Novels of the Jaran science fiction series
Jaran (1992)
An Earthly Crown (1993)
His Conquering Sword (1993)
The Law of Becoming (1994)
Court of Fives young adult fantasy series; Andre Norton Award nominee for Best Book of 2016
Court of Fives, Little, Brown Books for Young Readers, (2015) 
Poisoned Blade (2016)
Buried Heart (2017)
Night Flower (novella, 2015)
Bright Thrones (novella, 2017)
Black Wolves fantasy series, sequel to Crossroads series
Black Wolves, Orbit,  (2015)
Magic the Gathering trading card game, fantasy series
Core Set 2019 eight-episode short story cycle
Throne of Eldraine: The Wildered Quest (2019)
The Sun Chronicles science fiction adventure series
Unconquerable Sun, Tor Books,  (2020)
Servant Mage (novella), Tordotcom,  (January 2022)
The Keeper's Six, Tordotcom,  (January 2023)

Short stories

 "My Voice Is In My Sword" in Weird Tales from Shakespeare (1994), reprinted in Apex Magazine (2015)
 "The Memory of Peace" in Enchanted Forests (1995)
 "A Simple Act of Kindness" in The Shimmering Door (1996)
 "With God to Guard Her" in Return to Avalon (1996)
 "The Gates of Joriun" in Tarot Fantastic (1997)
 "Making the World Live Again" in Zodiac Fantastic (1997)
 "Sunseeker" in 30th Anniversary DAW Books Science Fiction (2002)
 "Riding the Shore of the River of Death" in A Fantasy Medley (2009), reprinted in Epic: Legends of Fantasy (2012)
 "Leaf and Branch and Grass and Vine" in Fearsome Journeys (2013)
 "Everything in the World Wants Something" in Book Smugglers (2017)
 "A Compendium of Architecture and the Science of Building" in Lightspeed Magazine (2018)
 "The Tinder Box" at Tor.com (2021)
The Very Best of Kate Elliott (2015) short story collection

References

External links
Official Kate Elliott web site

1958 births
Living people
20th-century American novelists
21st-century American novelists
American fantasy writers
American science fiction writers
American women short story writers
American women novelists
Writers from California
People from Junction City, Oregon
Women science fiction and fantasy writers
20th-century American women writers
21st-century American women writers
20th-century American short story writers
21st-century American short story writers
20th-century pseudonymous writers
21st-century pseudonymous writers
Pseudonymous women writers